Jembrana Regency is a regency (kabupaten) in the southwest of Bali, Indonesia. It has an area of 841.8 km2 and had a population of 261,638 at the 2010 Census and 317,064 at the 2020 Census. Its regency seat is Negara.

Administrative districts
The Regency is divided into five districts (kecamatan), listed below from west to east with their areas and their populations at the 2010 Census and the 2020 Census. The table also includes the number of administrative villages (rural desa and urban kelurahan) in each district, and its postal codes.

Notes: (a) including the small offshore islands of Pulau Buring and Pulau Kalong. (b) except four villages with different post codes - Baler Bale Agung (62212), Banjar Tengah (62213), Lelateng (62214) and Loloan Barat (62215). (c) except the villages of Pendem (62211) and Loloan Timur (62216).

References

External links